Kasen Williams (born December 5, 1992) is a former American football wide receiver. He played college football at Washington.

Early life
Williams attended Skyline High School in Sammamish, Washington, east of Seattle, where he lettered in football, track, and basketball.  numerous awards in high school, including the Parade All-America National Player of the Year, MaxPreps.com's National Player of the Year, and was also named a first-team All-American by USA Today, ESPN, and Maxpreps.com. After receiving multiple offers from other major programs, Williams committed to Washington just prior to his senior year at Skyline on

College career
As a true freshman at Washington in 2011, Williams appeared in all 13 games as a wide receiver and punt returner. He finished the season with 36 receptions for 427 yards   Williams started every game as a sophomore and earned honorable mention All-Pac-12 honors. He totaled 77 catches, earning him third place on the Huskies' all-time single-season reception list, and tallied 878 receiving yards  As a junior in 2013, he started every game until a season-ending broken fibula against California in late October. Head coach Steve Sarkisian departed that December and was succeeded by Chris Petersen. Williams played in every game in his senior season in 2014, starting six; he finished with a career-low 20 receptions for 189 yards and 2 touchdowns.

Professional career

Cincinnati Bengals 
Unselected in the 2015 NFL Draft, Williams signed with the Cincinnati Bengals shortly after, but was released in May after a

Seattle Seahawks 
The Seattle Seahawks signed Williams to a rookie mini-camp contract, where he impressed coaches with his sure-handed catching ability, and he was signed by the team on  but released on  The next day, on September 6, he was signed to their practice squad. On December 26, Williams was signed to the Seahawks'  replacing tight end Anthony McCoy who was put on injured reserve.

On September 3, 2016, Williams was released by the Seahawks as part of final roster cuts, and was then signed to their practice squad. On September 13, he was released from the Seahawks' practice squad, then re-signed to the practice squad on September 21. On December 27, he was promoted to the Seahawks' active roster to replace the injured 

In 2017, Williams caught four passes for 119 yards in his first preseason game on August 13, and caught a touchdown the next week against the Minnesota Vikings. Despite a strong preseason, Williams was waived by the Seahawks on September 2.

Cleveland Browns
The following day on September 3, 2017, Williams was claimed off waivers by the Cleveland Browns, but was waived on November 16 and was re-signed to their practice squad. He signed a reserve/future contract with the Browns on January 1, 2018, but was waived on April 30.

Indianapolis Colts
Williams signed with the Indianapolis Colts on May 11, 2018, but was waived on September 1.

Seattle Dragons
Williams was selected by the Seattle Dragons in the 7th round of the 2020 XFL Draft on October 15, 2019. He missed the first two games of the season with a quadriceps injury. He had his contract terminated when the league suspended operations on April 10, 2020.

Personal life
Williams' father Aaron also played college football at Washington; he was a standout wide receiver for the Huskies from  under head coach  Kasen's sister Kiara played soccer at Arizona State University

See also
 Washington Huskies football statistical leaders

References

Living people
1992 births
People from Sammamish, Washington
Players of American football from Washington (state)
American football wide receivers
Washington Huskies football players
Cincinnati Bengals players
Seattle Seahawks players
Sportspeople from King County, Washington
Cleveland Browns players
Indianapolis Colts players
Seattle Dragons players